The canton of Lectoure-Lomagne is an administrative division of the Gers department, southwestern France. It was created at the French canton reorganisation which came into effect in March 2015. Its seat is in Lectoure.

It consists of the following communes:
 
Berrac
Castéra-Lectourois
Castet-Arrouy
Flamarens
Gazaupouy
Gimbrède
L'Isle-Bouzon
Lagarde
Larroque-Engalin
Lectoure
Ligardes
Marsolan
Mas-d'Auvignon
Miradoux
Pergain-Taillac
Peyrecave
Plieux
Pouy-Roquelaure
La Romieu
Saint-Antoine
Saint-Avit-Frandat
Sainte-Mère
Saint-Martin-de-Goyne
Saint-Mézard
Sempesserre
Terraube

References

Cantons of Gers